Scaptodrosophila is a genus of flies of the family Drosophilidae.

Species

 Scaptodrosophila abdita
 Scaptodrosophila aclinata
 Scaptodrosophila acuta
 Scaptodrosophila adelphe
 Scaptodrosophila adyukru
 Scaptodrosophila agamse
 Scaptodrosophila akaju
 Scaptodrosophila albifrontata
 Scaptodrosophila albolimbata
 Scaptodrosophila altera
 Scaptodrosophila alternata
 Scaptodrosophila ambiguifascia
 Scaptodrosophila amydriae
 Scaptodrosophila anderssoni
 Scaptodrosophila angelicae
 Scaptodrosophila angusta
 Scaptodrosophila anthemon
 Scaptodrosophila anthia
 Scaptodrosophila anuda
 Scaptodrosophila anyi
 Scaptodrosophila aproclinata
 Scaptodrosophila aterrima
 Scaptodrosophila atricha
 Scaptodrosophila aurochaeta
 Scaptodrosophila bambuphila
 Scaptodrosophila bangi
 Scaptodrosophila bansadharae
 Scaptodrosophila barkeri
 Scaptodrosophila baseogrisea
 Scaptodrosophila bella
 Scaptodrosophila bicolor
 Scaptodrosophila bodmeri
 Scaptodrosophila brincki
 Scaptodrosophila brooksae
 Scaptodrosophila brunnea
 Scaptodrosophila brunneipennis
 Scaptodrosophila brunnotata
 Scaptodrosophila bryani
 Scaptodrosophila bushi
 Scaptodrosophila caledobrunnea
 Scaptodrosophila caledonica
 Scaptodrosophila caliginosa
 Scaptodrosophila cancellata
 Scaptodrosophila cederholmi
 Scaptodrosophila chandraprabhiana
 Scaptodrosophila chocolata
 Scaptodrosophila claropleura
 Scaptodrosophila claytoni
 Scaptodrosophila clunicrus
 Scaptodrosophila collessi
 Scaptodrosophila cominsiae
 Scaptodrosophila compressiceps
 Scaptodrosophila concolor
 Scaptodrosophila coniura
 Scaptodrosophila convexa
 Scaptodrosophila coracina
 Scaptodrosophila cristata
 Scaptodrosophila crocata
 Scaptodrosophila crockeri
 Scaptodrosophila cultello
 Scaptodrosophila decipiens
 Scaptodrosophila deflexa
 Scaptodrosophila diana
 Scaptodrosophila dibi
 Scaptodrosophila dichromos
 Scaptodrosophila divergens
 Scaptodrosophila dorsata
 Scaptodrosophila dorsocentralis
 Scaptodrosophila ebenea
 Scaptodrosophila ebonata
 Scaptodrosophila ehrmanae
 Scaptodrosophila elenthiensis
 Scaptodrosophila ellenae
 Scaptodrosophila eluta
 Scaptodrosophila elutoides
 Scaptodrosophila enigma
 Scaptodrosophila eoundo
 Scaptodrosophila evanescens
 Scaptodrosophila evenhuisi
 Scaptodrosophila excavata
 Scaptodrosophila excepta
 Scaptodrosophila exemplar
 Scaptodrosophila fimbriata
 Scaptodrosophila finitima
 Scaptodrosophila finnigana
 Scaptodrosophila flavipes
 Scaptodrosophila flavissima
 Scaptodrosophila framire
 Scaptodrosophila fringefera
 Scaptodrosophila fumida
 Scaptodrosophila fungi
 Scaptodrosophila fuscithorax
 Scaptodrosophila fuscopalpis
 Scaptodrosophila fuscovittata
 Scaptodrosophila garnetensis
 Scaptodrosophila garumga
 Scaptodrosophila glauca
 Scaptodrosophila gressitti
 Scaptodrosophila grossfieldi
 Scaptodrosophila hamptoni
 Scaptodrosophila heliconiae
 Scaptodrosophila hibisci
 Scaptodrosophila hirsuata
 Scaptodrosophila horaeogaster
 Scaptodrosophila horrifica
 Scaptodrosophila howensis
 Scaptodrosophila hypopygialis
 Scaptodrosophila incisurifrons
 Scaptodrosophila inconspicua
 Scaptodrosophila infuscata
 Scaptodrosophila inornata
 Scaptodrosophila insolita
 Scaptodrosophila jackeyi
 Scaptodrosophila jucunda
 Scaptodrosophila kennedyi
 Scaptodrosophila kirki
 Scaptodrosophila kohimaensis
 Scaptodrosophila koraputae
 Scaptodrosophila krishnamurthyi
 Scaptodrosophila kyushuensis
 Scaptodrosophila lagomorpha
 Scaptodrosophila lambi
 Scaptodrosophila lampra
 Scaptodrosophila lateralis
 Scaptodrosophila laterolinea
 Scaptodrosophila latifascia
 Scaptodrosophila latifasciaeformis
 Scaptodrosophila latifasciola
 Scaptodrosophila latifshahi
 Scaptodrosophila lativittata
 Scaptodrosophila lebanonensis
 Scaptodrosophila lobata
 Scaptodrosophila louisae
 Scaptodrosophila loxostyla
 Scaptodrosophila lugens
 Scaptodrosophila lurida
 Scaptodrosophila magna
 Scaptodrosophila mania
 Scaptodrosophila marginata
 Scaptodrosophila marjoryae
 Scaptodrosophila mbettie
 Scaptodrosophila medleri
 Scaptodrosophila megagenys
 Scaptodrosophila meijerei
 Scaptodrosophila melaena
 Scaptodrosophila melanopleura
 Scaptodrosophila merdae
 Scaptodrosophila metanthia
 Scaptodrosophila metatarsalis
 Scaptodrosophila metaxa
 Scaptodrosophila minima
 Scaptodrosophila minimeta
 Scaptodrosophila minnamurrae
 Scaptodrosophila mirei
 Scaptodrosophila moana
 Scaptodrosophila moenae
 Scaptodrosophila mokonfim
 Scaptodrosophila momortica
 Scaptodrosophila moronu
 Scaptodrosophila mossmana
 Scaptodrosophila mulgravei
 Scaptodrosophila multipunctata
 Scaptodrosophila mundagensis
 Scaptodrosophila nannosoma
 Scaptodrosophila nausea
 Scaptodrosophila neomedleri
 Scaptodrosophila neozelandica
 Scaptodrosophila nicholsoni
 Scaptodrosophila nicolae
 Scaptodrosophila nigrescens
 Scaptodrosophila nigriceps
 Scaptodrosophila nigrifrons
 Scaptodrosophila nigrofemorata
 Scaptodrosophila nigrops
 Scaptodrosophila nimia
 Scaptodrosophila nitidithorax
 Scaptodrosophila norfolkensis
 Scaptodrosophila notha
 Scaptodrosophila novamaculosa
 Scaptodrosophila novoguineensis
 Scaptodrosophila nublada
 Scaptodrosophila nuda
 Scaptodrosophila obsoleta
 Scaptodrosophila oenops
 Scaptodrosophila oncera
 Scaptodrosophila oralis
 Scaptodrosophila oreibatis
 Scaptodrosophila oresibios
 Scaptodrosophila oweni
 Scaptodrosophila ovidenticulata
 Scaptodrosophila oviminiatus
 Scaptodrosophila palauana
 Scaptodrosophila pallidipes
 Scaptodrosophila parabrunnea
 Scaptodrosophila paracentralis
 Scaptodrosophila paraclubata
 Scaptodrosophila paracultello
 Scaptodrosophila paraguma
 Scaptodrosophila paranthia
 Scaptodrosophila paraphryniae
 Scaptodrosophila parapsychotriae
 Scaptodrosophila parapunctipennis
 Scaptodrosophila paratriangulata
 Scaptodrosophila paratriangulifer
 Scaptodrosophila parsonsi
 Scaptodrosophila parviramosa
 Scaptodrosophila peniquadrata
 Scaptodrosophila phryniae
 Scaptodrosophila pictipennis
 Scaptodrosophila pilicrus
 Scaptodrosophila pilopalpus
 Scaptodrosophila plaua
 Scaptodrosophila pleurolineata
 Scaptodrosophila pleurovittata
 Scaptodrosophila plumata
 Scaptodrosophila precaria
 Scaptodrosophila pressobrunnea
 Scaptodrosophila pseudoebenea
 Scaptodrosophila psychotriae
 Scaptodrosophila pugionata
 Scaptodrosophila pumilio
 Scaptodrosophila puncteluta
 Scaptodrosophila puncticeps
 Scaptodrosophila puriensis
 Scaptodrosophila pusio
 Scaptodrosophila pygmaea
 Scaptodrosophila quadriradiata
 Scaptodrosophila quadristriata
 Scaptodrosophila rhabdote
 Scaptodrosophila rhinos
 Scaptodrosophila rhypara
 Scaptodrosophila riverata
 Scaptodrosophila rufifrons
 Scaptodrosophila rufuloventer
 Scaptodrosophila saba
 Scaptodrosophila samoaensis
 Scaptodrosophila scaptomyzoidea
 Scaptodrosophila scutellaris
 Scaptodrosophila scutellimargo
 Scaptodrosophila scutellopilosa
 Scaptodrosophila senufo
 Scaptodrosophila setaria
 Scaptodrosophila setifera
 Scaptodrosophila silvalineata
 Scaptodrosophila simplex
 Scaptodrosophila sinape
 Scaptodrosophila singularis
 Scaptodrosophila smicra
 Scaptodrosophila spathicola
 Scaptodrosophila specensis
 Scaptodrosophila specensoides
 Scaptodrosophila spinifrons
 Scaptodrosophila spinomelana
 Scaptodrosophila stramineipes
 Scaptodrosophila strigifrons
 Scaptodrosophila subacuticornis
 Scaptodrosophila subeluta
 Scaptodrosophila subminima
 Scaptodrosophila subnitida
 Scaptodrosophila subtilis
 Scaptodrosophila sumatrensis
 Scaptodrosophila sydneyensis
 Scaptodrosophila thodayi
 Scaptodrosophila throckmortoni
 Scaptodrosophila triangulifer
 Scaptodrosophila tricingulata
 Scaptodrosophila triseta
 Scaptodrosophila uebe
 Scaptodrosophila valeana
 Scaptodrosophila variata
 Scaptodrosophila varipes
 Scaptodrosophila vazrae
 Scaptodrosophila victoria
 Scaptodrosophila vindicta
 Scaptodrosophila xanthops
 Scaptodrosophila xanthorrhoeae
 Scaptodrosophila xiphiochaeta
 Scaptodrosophila zebrina
 Scaptodrosophila zingiphila
 Scaptodrosophila zophera

References

Drosophilidae genera